Acanthoscaphites is an extinct genus of cephalopod belonging to the Ammonite subclass.

Classification
Acanthoscaphites was first described by Schluter in 1872. Subsequent taxonomic revisions indicate that the relationship between Acanthoscaphites and Trachyscaphites is still unclear: Acanthoscaphites may have evolved in parallel with or as a derivative of Trachyscaphites.

Species

A. plenus 
A. tridens
A. verneuilianus

Biogeography
Acanthoscaphites was a widespread genus during Campanian and Maastrichtian times, approximately 80 million years ago. Its remains can be found in rocks of that age from Europe and North America.

References

Late Cretaceous ammonites of Europe
Late Cretaceous ammonites of North America
Ammonitida genera
Scaphitidae
Campanian genus first appearances
Maastrichtian genus extinctions